Japan was the host nation for the 1964 Summer Olympics in Tokyo. 328 competitors, 270 men and 58 women, took part in 155 events in 21 sports.

Medalists

| width=78% align=left valign=top |

| width=22% align=left valign=top |

Athletics

Basketball

Preliminary round

Group A

October 11

12 October

October 13

October 14

October 16

October 17

October 18

Classification brackets
9th–12th Place
21 October

9th Place
23 October

Boxing

Men

Canoeing

Men

Women

Cycling

15 cyclists represented Japan in 1964.

Road

Track
1000m time trial

Men's tandem

Men's Sprint

Pursuit

Diving

Men

Women

Equestrian

Dressage

Eventing

Show jumping

Fencing

15 fencers, 11 men and 4 women, represented Japan in 1964.

Men's foil
 Kazuo Mano
 Heizaburo Okawa
 Kazuhiko Tabuchi

Men's team foil
 Kazuhiko Tabuchi, Fujio Shimizu, Kazuo Mano, Heizaburo Okawa, Sosuke Toda

Men's épée
 Heizaburo Okawa
 Kazuhiko Tabuchi
 Toshiaki Araki

Men's team épée
 Toshiaki Araki, Katsutada Minatoi, Kazuhiko Tabuchi, Heizaburo Okawa, Takeshi Teshima

Men's sabre
 Mitsuyuki Funamizu
 Seiji Shibata
 Teruhiro Kitao

Men's team sabre
 Fujio Shimizu, Teruhiro Kitao, Seiji Shibata, Mitsuyuki Funamizu

Women's foil
 Tomoko Owada
 Tamiko Yasui
 Yoshie Takeuchi

Women's team foil
 Yoshie Komori, Tamiko Yasui, Tomoko Owada, Yoshie Takeuchi

Football

First round

Group D

Quarter-finals

First consolation round 
Played by losing quarter-finalists.

Gymnastics

Hockey

Preliminary round
The preliminary round was conducted by breaking the 15 teams into two groups of 7 and 8 teams.  The groups then played a round-robin tournament with each team playing the other teams in the group once.  2 points were awarded for a win, 1 point for a tie, and 0 for a loss.  The top two teams from each group advanced to the semifinals while the third and fourth played in consolation semifinals.

Group A

 Pakistan def. Japan 1-0
 Australia def. Japan 3-1
 Japan def. Kenya 2-0
 Great Britain def. Japan 1-0
 Japan def. Rhodesia 2-1
 Japan def. New Zealand 1-0

Semifinals
The top two teams in each of the groups played in the 1st-4th semifinals, with the winner of each group playing the second-place team in the other group.  The third and fourth team in each group played in the consolation semifinals

Judo

Four judoka, all male, represented Japan in 1964.

Men's lightweight
 Takehide Nakatani

Men's mightweight
 Isao Okano

Men's heavyweight
 Isao Inokuma

Men's open class
 Akio Kaminaga

Modern pentathlon

Three male pentathletes represented Japan in 1964.

Individual
 Shigeaki Uchino
 Yoshihide Fukutome
 Shigeki Mino

Team
 Shigeaki Uchino
 Yoshihide Fukutome
 Shigeki Mino

Rowing

Men

Sailing

Open

Shooting

Ten shooters represented Japan in 1964. Yoshihisa Yoshikawa won the bronze medal in the 50 m pistol event.
Men

Swimming

Men

Women

Volleyball

Men's team competition

|}

|}

Team roster
 Yutaka Demachi 
 Tsutomu Koyama 
 Sadatoshi Sugahara 
 Naohiro Ikeda 
 Yassu Saito 
 Toshiaki Kosedo 
 Tokihiko Higuchi 
 Masayuki Minami 
 Takeshi Tokutomi 
 Teruhisa Moriyama 
 Yūzo Nakamura 
 Katsutoshi Nekoda

Women's team competition

Round robin

Final standings

Team roster
 Masae Kasai 
 Emiko Miyamoto
 Kinuko Tanida
 Yuriko Handa 
 Yoshiko Matsumura 
 Sata Isobe 
 Katsumi Matsumura 
 Yoko Shinozaki 
 Setsuko Sasaki 
 Yuko Fujimoto 
 Masako Kondo 
 Ayano Shibuki 
Head coach: Hirofumi Daimatsu

Water polo

Group A

October 11, 1964

October 12, 1964

October 13, 1964

Weightlifting

Men

Wrestling

References

External links
Official Olympic Reports
International Olympic Committee results database

Nations at the 1964 Summer Olympics
1964
Summer Olympics